Charu (Tibetan:  ཆ་རུ། Chinese: 迦入空间) is coffee shop, event center, Tibetan handicrafts shop and working space in Chengdu, China. It is operated by Tibetan nomads.

It purveys various tea and coffee beverages, such as yak milk coffee, yak yogurt and some foods, including momo dumplings. Charu space is mentioned as Chengdu travel destiny on Wall Street Journal.

Charu Space is a social entrepreneur which is more than just a coffee shop. It is a cultural center with events trying to bridge the gap between the traditional knowledge and the modern business through talks, events and cultural products.

Events
Charu host talks on mainly social entrepreneur and other topics such as traditional cultural vitalization and environmental protection. It also hosts toastmaster and yoga courses.

References

Coffeehouses and cafés in China
Companies based in Chengdu